Tony Alanis is an American mixed martial artist who has the distinction of having fought on the first World Extreme Cagefighting (WEC) event.

Alanis had a total of 8 professional MMA fights, 6 of them for the WEC, compiling a career record of 5 wins and 3 losses. His last fight was a KO of Tom Owens at the Palace Fighting Championships 6 on January 17, 2008.

Mixed martial arts record

|-
| Win
| align=center| 5-3
| Tom Owens
| TKO (Punches)
| PFC 6: No Retreat, No Surrender
| 
| align=center| 1
| align=center| 2:58
| 
| 
|-
| Loss
| align=center| 4-3
| Joe Martin
| Submission (Heel Hook)
| WEC 19: Undisputed
| 
| align=center| 2
| align=center| 2:26
| 
| 
|-
| Win
| align=center| 4-2
| Johnny Fadella
| TKO (Punches)
| WEC 15 - Judgment Day
| 
| align=center| 1
| align=center| 1:54
| 
| 
|-
| Loss
| align=center| 3-2
| Tom Owens
| Submission (Triangle Armbar)
| WEC 8 - Halloween Fury 2
| 
| align=center| 1
| align=center| 1:49
| 
| 
|-
| Win
| align=center| 3-1
| Don Rugebreght
| Submission (Punches)
| WEC 7 - This Time It's Personal
| 
| align=center| 1
| align=center| 1:54
| 
| 
|-
| Loss
| align=center| 2-1
| Shaun Beckett
| Submission (Armbar)
| IFC WC 17 - Warriors Challenge 17
| 
| align=center| 1
| align=center| 0:15
| 
| 
|-
| Win
| align=center| 2-0
| Jesse Heck
| TKO (Punches)
| WEC 3 - All or Nothing
| 
| align=center| 1
| align=center| 0:14
| 
| 
|-
| Win
| align=center| 1-0
| Bryant Garcia
| Submission (Punches)
| WEC 1 - Princes of Pain
| 
| align=center| 1
| align=center| 1:33
| 
|

References

American male mixed martial artists
Living people
Year of birth missing (living people)